Ayn Qadib (also spelled Ein Qadib) is a Syrian village in the al-Qadmus Subdistrict of the Baniyas District in Tartous Governorate. It is situated between Masyaf to the east and Kaf al-Jaa to the west. According to the Syria Central Bureau of Statistics (CBS), Ayn Qadib had a population of 630 in the 2004 census.

References

Populated places in Baniyas District